Anton Hilbert (December 24, 1898 – February 16, 1986) was a German politician of the Christian Democratic Union (CDU) and former member of the German Bundestag.

Life 
In 1945 he participated in the foundation of the CDU in Thuringia. After returning to Baden, he joined the BCSV there in the same year, which later became the Baden regional association of the CDU. From 1948 to 1962 he was deputy state chairman of the CDU in southern Baden.

From 1946 to 1947 Hilbert was a member of the Consultative State Assembly, from 1947 to 1952 of the Landtag of Baden and then until 1956 of the Landtag of Baden-Württemberg. As of March 7, 1949, he was a member of the Parliamentary Council.

Hilbert was a member of the German Bundestag from its first election in 1949 to 1969. He first represented the constituency of Donaueschingen and since 1965 the constituency of Waldshut in Parliament. From September 21, 1949, to January 17, 1950, he was deputy chairman of the CDU/CSU parliamentary group.

Literature

References

1898 births
1986 deaths
Members of the Bundestag for Baden-Württemberg
Members of the Bundestag 1965–1969
Members of the Bundestag 1961–1965
Members of the Bundestag 1957–1961
Members of the Bundestag 1953–1957
Members of the Bundestag 1949–1953
Members of the Bundestag for the Christian Democratic Union of Germany
Members of the Landtag of Baden-Württemberg
Members of Parlamentarischer Rat
Recipients of the Order of Merit of Baden-Württemberg